Wakin Chau (born 22 December 1960), better known by his stage name Emil Chau during the 1980s and 1990s, is a Hong Kong-born Taiwanese singer and actor, popular throughout Taiwan, Hong Kong, Mainland China, and parts of Southeast Asia (Singapore, Malaysia, Indonesia and Vietnam). As of 2007, he has released more than 40 albums.

Early life
Wakin Chau was born in a rice store owned by his family at Sai Ying Pun in Hong Kong, the fourth son of seven children. He began learning the guitar when he was about 13 years old. In 1979, he left for Taipei to major in mathematics at National Taiwan University. While at college he sang and played folk songs in local coffee shops, learning to sing in Mandarin.

Music career
Hoping to establish a career as a recording artist, Chau sought contacts in the music industry, but after a lack of success, eventually signed on as an assistant producer at Rock Records, where he wrote pop songs for other artists. He was later encouraged by Chyi Yu to perform jingles for commercial advertisements. One of his jingles for a car commercial was heard by his boss at Rock, who recognised his voice and gave him a chance to record a Mandarin album, released on Rock Records in 1987.

From 1985, under the name Emil Chau, he has released more than 40 albums in Mandarin, Cantonese and English. His platinum albums, including You Make Me Happy and Sad, The Flowery Heart, Music Brings Us Together and Emil & Friends have won awards in Taiwan, Mainland China, Hong Kong and Singapore. Chau reverted to using his given name Wakin in 1999.

Chau formed the four-member supergroup Superband, along with Jonathan Lee, Chang Chen-yue and Lo Ta-yu. They disbanded and resumed their solo careers in 2010.

Other activities
Chau has also appeared in some films, and on TV and radio programs in China, Hong Kong, Taiwan, Malaysia, Singapore and Japan. Alongside his singing career, he is a restaurateur and is active in international charitable causes, such as kidney dialysis charities in Singapore, the January 2002 "Take a Deep Breath" concert in Taipei to raise money for local health-care organisations, Beijing's 4th Grand Charity Drive for Children in 2005, and Jackie Chan's all-star concerts in Las Vegas.

Discography

Mandarin albums
  The Last Waltz (Feb 1985)
  Direction of the Heart (Jul 1987)
  I Gave My Love I Realized My Dream (Aug 1988)
  The More You Give the More You Expect (Jan 1989)
  The Truest Dream (Nov 1989)
  I Don't Want to Be Alone (Dec 1990)
  You Make Me Happy and Sad (Nov 1991)
  The Flowery Heart (Apr 1993)
  Asia Tour'93 Emil Alive! (Jan 1994)
  Nothing Will Stop Me From Loving You (Jun 1994)
  I Am Willing to Go Soon (Feb 1995)
  Love Follows Us (Jul 1995)
  Light of Love (Feb 1996)
  My Little Paradise (Sep 1996)
  Emil & Friends (Apr 1997)
  Story Teller (Aug 1998)
  Now (Nov 1999)
  Day Lilies (Otc 2001)
  All Out (2003)
  Love Hotel (Jul 2003)
  Keep Wakin 1987-2002 (Sep 2003)
  Wakin in the Rain (Mar 2006)
  Diva (May 2011)
  Jiang Hu (Dec 2013)
  My Farewell Lady (Mar 2019)
  The Younger Me (Dec 2019)
  A Song for You (Feb 2020)

Cantonese albums
 Music Brings Us Together (Otc 1994)
 (Apr 1995)
 (Dec 1995)
 Emil's Live Moments (Jun 1996)
 Living With Emil Chau (Dec 1996)
 (Otc 1997)
 (Feb 1998)

English albums
Sad Without You (Sep 1988)
Blue Bird (Feb 1991)
I Remember (May 1992)
Songs of Birds (Aug 1993)
Forever Young (Best Collection) (Jun 1996)
My Oh My (Feb 2001)
My Favorite Songs (May 2002)

Collaborations
 "Beijing Welcomes You" (2008) with various artists (only Sony Music Taiwan)
 "I Love You Suddenly" (2009) with Della Ding - Autumn's Concerto ending theme

Filmography
1987: Osmanthus Alley
1987: The Game They Called Sex - Tung Tzu-Chi
1993: Once a Cop (aka. Project S) - Martin Lee
1994: Right Here Waiting - Alex Chow
1995: Rumble in the Bronx - Ice Cream Man
1995: Just Married - Kong Chi Wa
1995: I Want To Go on Living - Man Chi-Yeung
1995: Faithfully Yours - Pao Wing-Cheung
1996: Who's the Woman, Who's the Man? (金枝玉葉2)
1997: Mr. Nice Guy - Ice Cream Man
1997: All's Well, Ends Well 1997 - Long
1997: 
1997: Walk In
1997: Spicy Love Soup - Neighbor
1999: Gorgeous - L.W. Lo
1999: Purple Storm - Ma Li
2001: Headlines - Sorrow Chan
2003: Homerun - Policeman
2003: The Pawnshop No. 8 (TV Series)

References

External links
Wakin.com (Big5-code; his personal website in Taiwan)
True Blue Emil's Page (Hong Kong, Big5-code)
Sunny Stars Ferry — Wakin Chau (China, GB-code)
Every Wakin's Moment (Singapore, English & GB-code)
 (English)

1960 births
Hong Kong male singers
Cantopop singers
English-language singers from Hong Kong
Hong Kong Mandopop singer-songwriters
Hong Kong male film actors
Taiwanese people of Hong Kong descent
Cantonese people
Living people
National Taiwan University alumni
Superband (band) members